Anna Tatishvili was the defending champion, but lost in the second round to Kateryna Bondarenko.

Bondarenko went on to win the tournament, defeating Grace Min in the final, 6–4, 7–5.

Seeds

Main draw

Finals

Top half

Bottom half

References 
 Main draw

USTA Tennis Classic of Macon - Singles